The second season of the Mexican legal drama telenovela Por amar sin ley premiered on 3 March 2019 and ended on 5 July 2019, with production for the season having commenced in June 2018. The series is the second production of Las Estrellas to have a second season, after Mi marido tiene familia.

Plot 
Vega y Asociados is suffering an attack that puts the lives of all its lawyers at risk. After the death of Isabel and the kidnapping of Jaime, a new attack against Alonso makes everyone alert and worried about taking care of each other. Despite the aggressions they have suffered, the lawyers do not stop and continue the search against Jacinto Dorantes, who continues to be a fugitive. Alejandra is vulnerable because of her father's kidnapping, not knowing that Carlos, in order to help her free Jaime, is committing himself more to El Ciego. Gustavo is immersed in a deep depression that does not allow him to glimpse the thin line that exists between justice and revenge. Alonso does everything possible to do the justice that has sought so much, taking Jacinto Dorantes prisoner.

Despite all the problems they have to deal with, the team of lawyers continues to help their clients, victims of shocking cases. The office is strengthened with the arrival of new lawyers: Sofía Alcocer, specialist in criminal law; Javier Rivas, criminal lawyer specializing in criminology; Adrián Carvallo, specialist in international law; Lorena Fuentes, a recent graduate; and Manuel Durán, a young lawyer who is just doing his professional practices. The rivalry with Carlos' office is increasing. He hires Nancy Muñoz, an attractive criminal lawyer who does not touch her heart in order to achieve what she needs, to show Carlos everything she is capable of.

Cast 
 Ana Brenda Contreras as Alejandra Ponce
 David Zepeda as Ricardo Bustamante
 Julián Gil as Carlos Ibarra
 José María Torre Hütt as Roberto Morelli
 Sergio Basañez as Gustavo Soto
 Altair Jarabo as Victoria Escalante
 Guillermo García Cantú as Alonso Vega
 Kimberly Dos Ramos as Sofía Alcócer
 Moisés Arizmendi as Alan Páez
 Geraldine Bazán as Elena Fernández
 Víctor García as Juan López
 Marco Méndez as Javier Rivas
 Axel Ricco as El Ciego
 Alejandra García as Lorena Fuentes
 Mar Zamora as Nancy Muñoz
 Julio Vallado as Manuel Durán
 Mauricio Rousselon as Raúl
 Marc Clotet as Adrián Carballo
 Azela Robinson as Paula Ortega
 Roberto Ballesteros as Jaime Ponce
 Leticia Perdigón as Susana López
 Alejandro Tommasi as Nicolás
 Arlette Pacheco as Carmen
 Karina Ancira as Sonia
 Nataly Umaña as Tatiana
 Elías Campo as El Chivo
 Diego Val as El Cuervo
 Lourdes Munguía as Lourdes
 Polly as Alicia
 Daniela Álvarez as Fer
 Lucía Silva as Michelle

Special guest stars 

 Juan Carlos Barreto as Jacinto Dorantes
 Ivonne Montero as Miriam
 Mauricio Abularach as Samuel
 Nora Salinas as Raquel
 Federico Ayos as Julio
 Thomas Victor Procida as Phillip
 Rafael del Villar as Sergio Cervantes
 Jeffrey Milton Pearson as Jacob Robbins
 Regina Castillo as Annie
 Manuel Lugo as Joe
 José Montini as Ramiro Dorantes
 Dayren Chávez as Eva
 Marcia Coutiño as Luisa
 Eugenio Cobo as Téllez
 Arsenio Campos as Gilberto
 Alfredo Herrera as Rafael
 Silvia Lomelí as Verónica
 Marlene Favela as Mónica
 Daniel Rascón as El Gato
 Laura Ferretti as Ariadna
 Diego de Erice as David
 Agustín Arana as Damián
 Erika Buenfil as Camila
 Claudia Lizaldi as Valeria
 Bea Ranero as Tania
 Raquel Olmedo as Astrid
 Lucero Lander as Irma
 Francisco Calmillo as Gerente Rebolledo
 Omar Germenos as Andrés Camacho
 Albi De Abreu as El Gringo
 Yahir Romo as Claudio
 Mimi Morales as Violeta
 Stephanie Slayton as Megan
 Tania Nicole as Sol
 Tamara Henaine as Sra. Ortega
 Tania Lizaldi as Srita. Ávila
 José Luis Cordero as Sr. Martínez
 Ricardo Crespo as Sergio
 Frank Medellín as Eduardo
 Luis Uribe as Dr. Ramos
 Solkin Ruz as Beto Ramos
 Blaine Burdette as Blums
 Chiquinquirá Delgado as Cristina
 Danielle Muehelen as Sharon
 Yamil Yaber as Federico Bustamante
 Karime Yaber as Natalia Bustamante
 Lilia Aragón as Gabriela
 Luis Couturier as Uriel
 Dalilah Polanco as Fanny
 Claudia Sophia García as Karla
 Gloria Sierra as Janet
 Norma Herrera as Lucrecia
 Roberto D’Amico as Felipe
 Anthony Álvarez as Trevor
 Eugenia Cauduro as Josefina
 Manuel Balbi as Leonardo
 Ilithya Manzanilla as Olivia
 Rodrigo Virago as Camilo
 Ferdinando Valencia as Víctor
 Erick Díaz as Ramón
 Chris Pacal as Erick
 Elvira Monsell as Eugenia
 Arturo Carmona as Daniel
 Marisol del Olmo as Rocio
 Jorge Poza as Fabián
 Mar Contreras as Lorenza

Production

Development 
On May 10, 2018, during the Univision Upfront for the 2018–2019 television season, it was confirmed that the series had been renewed for a second season. Whose production began on June 11, 2018 in Baja California Sur, one month after having finished with the production of the first season.

Casting 

After the confirmation of a second season. On 23 May 2018, it was confirmed that Geraldine Bazán and Issabela Camil would not be in the second part of the series. After the departure of some actors from the main cast, on 2 August 2018, the inclusion of Spanish actor Marc Clotet was confirmed. On 4 September 2018, it was confirmed that Kimberly Dos Ramos, who participated in the previous season as a guest, would be part of the main cast during the second season, and also confirmed the inclusion of Erika Buenfil who shares credits with Dos Ramos.

On 17 October 2018, it was confirmed that the Venezuelan actress Chiquinquirá Delgado would resume her acting career during the second season playing Cristina, her participation "is about a woman who has to make a firm decision about an experience of sexual harassment". Much of her participation will be in English and she shares credits mostly with Kimberly Dos Ramos, Ilithya Manzanilla, Marc Clotet and Manuel Balbi. The filming of the participation was filmed in Boston and New York and part of forum 15 of Televisa San Ángel and Mexico City. 8 November 2018 it was confirmed that Arturo Carmona and Marisol del Olmo would participate in a case "where a couple fights for the custody of their children, with a tragic outcome in which the mother kills the children and tries to commit suicide". The filming of this story was made in Mexico City and in the Televisa San Ángel forum.

Episodes 

Notes

References 

2019 Mexican television seasons